USS Forest Rose was a stern wheel steamer in the United States Navy.

Forest Rose was built in 1862 in Pittsburgh; purchased 15 November 1862; and commissioned 3 December 1862, Acting Master G. W. Brown in command.

Assigned to patrol duty in the Mississippi Squadron, Forest Rose sailed in active cooperation with the Army of the Mississippi throughout her war-time career. She convoyed transports, carried messages, fired on Confederate shore positions and troop detachments, and captured or destroyed a number of small steamers. Her first operations, from 4 to 11 January 1863, were against Fort Hindman in the Arkansas River, and the next month she sailed in the Yazoo Pass Expedition, destroying storehouses and a shipyard at Yazoo City. From 1 June she cruised above Vicksburg, Mississippi, aiding in communications with General U. S. Grant during the last month of the siege on the city, which fell 4 July. From that time, her operations were between Vicksburg and Natchez on the Mississippi, and in the many rivers which flow into it.

From 5 to 15 May 1864 Forest Rose took part in the Red River Expedition, and during the remaining months of the war, several times fired on small parties of Confederates ashore.

Post war  

Following the war, she carried ordnance and surplus stores from New Orleans, Louisiana to Jefferson, Missouri, until decommissioned at Mound City, Illinois, 7 August 1865. She was sold 17 August 1865.

References 

Ships built in Pittsburgh
Steamships of the United States Navy
Ships of the Union Navy
Gunboats of the United States Navy
1862 ships